The New Zealand women's national cricket team, nicknamed the White Ferns, represents New Zealand in international women's cricket. One of eight teams competing in the ICC Women's Championship (the highest level of international women's cricket), the team is organised by New Zealand Cricket, a full member of the International Cricket Council (ICC).

New Zealand made its Test debut in 1935, against England, becoming the third team to play at that level. With Australia and England, New Zealand is one of only three teams to have participated in all ten editions of the Women's Cricket World Cup. The team has made the final of the tournament on four occasions, winning in 2000 and placing second in 1993, 1997, and 2009. At the Women's World Twenty20, New Zealand were runners-up in 2009 and 2010, but are yet to win the event.

Tournament history

Honours

ICC
Women's World Cup:
 Champions (1): 2000
 Runners-up (3): 1993, 1997, 2009
Women's T20 World Cup:
 Runners-up (2): 2009, 2010

Others
Commonwealth Games
 Bronze medal (1): 2022

Current squad
This lists all the players are centrally contracted with NZC or was named in the most recent ODI or T20I squad. Updated as on 6 October 2022

Uncapped players are listed in italics

Coaching staff

Records and statistics 

International Match Summary — New Zealand Women

Last updated 17 February 2023

Women's Test cricket

Highest team total: 517/8 v. England on 24 June 1996 at North Marine Road Ground, Scarborough.
Highest individual score: 204, Kirsty Flavell v. England on 24 June 1996 at North Marine Road Ground, Scarborough.
Best innings bowling: 7/41, Jos Burley v. England on 6 August 1966 at The Oval, London.

Most Test runs for New Zealand Women

Most Test wickets for New Zealand Women

Highest individual innings in Women's Test

Best bowling figures in an innings in Women's Test

Women's Test record versus other nations

Records complete to Women's Test #123. Last updated 24 August 2004.

Women's One-Day International

Highest team total: 491/4 v. Ireland on 8 June 2018 at YMCA Cricket Club, Dublin.
Highest individual score: 232*, Amelia Kerr v. Ireland on 13 June 2018 at YMCA Cricket Club, Dublin.
Best innings bowling: 6/10, Jackie Lord v. India on 14 January 1982 at Cornwall Park, Auckland.

Top 5 individual innings in Women's ODI

Top 5 best bowling figures in an innings in Women's ODI

Most WODI runs for New Zealand Women 

Most WODI wickets for New Zealand Women 

WODI record versus other nations

Records complete to WODI #1308. Last updated 17 December 2022.

Women's T20I cricket 

Highest team total: 216/1, v. South Africa on 20 June 2018 at County Ground, Taunton.
Highest individual innings: 124*, Suzie Bates v. South Africa on 20 June 2018 at County Ground, Taunton.
Best innings bowling: 6/17, Amy Satterthwaite v. England on 16 August 2007 at County Ground, Taunton.

Top 5 individual innings in Women's T20I

Top 5 Best bowling figures in an innings in Women's T20I

Most WT20I runs for New Zealand Women

Most WT20I wickets for New Zealand Women

WT20I record versus other nations

Records complete to WT20I #1367. Last updated 17 February 2023.

Note: New Zealand Women lost a Super Over against Australia Women and won a Super Over against West Indies Women.

See also
 New Zealand men's team

Notes

Further reading

External links
 official website

 
 
Women's national cricket teams
Women